The canton of Quercy-Rouergue is an administrative division of the Tarn-et-Garonne department, in southern France. It was created at the French canton reorganisation which came into effect in March 2015. Its seat is in Septfonds.

It consists of the following communes:

Castanet 
Caylus
Cayriech
Cazals
Espinas
Féneyrols
Ginals
Labastide-de-Penne
Lacapelle-Livron
Laguépie
Lapenche
Lavaurette
Loze
Monteils
Mouillac
Parisot 
Puylagarde
Puylaroque
Saint-Antonin-Noble-Val
Saint-Cirq
Saint-Georges
Saint-Projet
Septfonds
Varen
Verfeil

References

Cantons of Tarn-et-Garonne